Fives-Lille was a French engineering company located at Fives, a suburb of Lille. It is now part of the Fives Group.

History
This co-operation led to expansion and the creation of several factories. One plant, located in the district of Fives, near Lille, specialized in the construction of rails and steam locomotives. Another plant in Givors on the Rhône specialized in wheelsets for railway rolling stock.

The business developed and became, in 1865, the Compagnie de Fives - Lille, then in 1868, the limited company Compagnie de Fives-Lille pour constructions mécaniques et entreprises. It appears that the Cail company kept its separate identity and did not merge with Fives-Lille until 1958. Later, it  changed its name to "Fives-Lille-Cail" and then to "Fives-Cail-Babcock" and finally to "Fives", in 2007.

Preservation
 Fives-Lille locomotive no. 3716 is preserved at

References

Fives-Lille